No. 66 Madhura Bus is a 2012 Malayalam road movie directed by M. A. Nishad and stars Pasupathy, Padmapriya, Shwetha Menon, Mallika, Makarand Deshpande, Thilakan and Jagathy Sreekumar in pivotal roles. The screenplay is by noted author K. V. Anil. A journey of love and revenge, the film's story unfolds amidst the travel of an interstate bus.M. A. Nishad, has earlier directed Pakal, Nagaram, Aayudham, Vairam and quite recently Best of Luck. M.Jayachandran composed  musical score for the film with lyrics written by Vayalar Sharathchandra Verma and Rajiv Alunkal.

Cast
 Pasupathy as Varadarajan
 Shwetha Menon as Rita Mammen/Jail Welfare Officer
 Padmapriya as Sooryapadmam
 Mallika as Bhavayami/Varadarajan's wife
 Makarand Deshpande as Sanjayan
 Thilakan as Vettaikaran Varkey
 Jagathy Sreekumar as Mathaikutty/Bus Conductor
 Jagadeesh as Police Officer
Sudheer Karamana as Parameshwaran
Vijaybabu as Ravichandran/DFO
Anil Murali as Antappan/Vettakkaran Varkky's son
 Seema G. Nair as Sumithra/Parameswaran's wife
 Abatis Thokalath as Sanjayan Jr.
 Rekha as Subadhra/Ravichandran's sister
Sasi Kalinga as Swami
Chembil Ashokan as Arumugam
Sathaar as Jailer Koshy

Awards

References

External links 

2010s Malayalam-language films
2010s road movies
Indian road movies
2012 films
Films about buses
Films shot in Tamil Nadu
Films directed by M. A. Nishad
Films scored by M. Jayachandran